The 2020 Florida State Seminoles baseball team represented Florida State University during the 2020 NCAA Division I baseball season. The Seminoles played their home games at Mike Martin Field at Dick Howser Stadium as a member of the Atlantic Coast Conference. They were led by head coach Mike Martin Jr., in his first season as head coach after succeeding his father and 40-year head coach, Mike Martin, prior to the season.

On March 12, 2020, the season was suspended indefinitely due to the ongoing coronavirus outbreak. On March 17, 2020, the conference announced that the remainder of the season was canceled.

Previous season
The Seminoles finished 2019 with a trip to the College World Series, making their 22nd appearance in Omaha.  They finished with a 1–2 record in the event, good for fifth place.  For the season, Florida State compiled a record of 42–23, and finished in third place in the ACC Atlantic Division with a 17–13 mark.

Personnel

Roster

Coaching Staff

Schedule

Ranking Movements

^ Collegiate Baseball ranks 40 teams in their preseason poll, but only ranks 30 teams weekly during the season.
† NCBWA ranks 35 teams in their preseason poll, but only ranks 30 teams weekly during the season.
* New poll was not released for this week so for comparison purposes the previous week's ranking is inserted in this week's slot.

Awards

2020 MLB draft

References

Florida State Seminoles baseball seasons
Florida State Seminoles
Florida State Seminoles baseball